A hamburger, or simply burger, is a sandwich consisting of fillings—usually a patty of ground meat, typically beef—placed inside a sliced bun or bread roll. Hamburgers are often served with cheese, lettuce, tomato, onion, pickles, bacon, or chilis; condiments such as ketchup, mustard, mayonnaise, relish, or a "special sauce," often a variation of Thousand Island dressing; and are frequently placed on sesame seed buns. A hamburger patty topped with cheese is called a cheeseburger.

The term burger can also be applied to the meat patty on its own, especially in the United Kingdom, where the term patty is rarely used or can even refer to ground beef. Since the term hamburger usually implies beef, for clarity burger may be prefixed with the type of meat or meat substitute used, as in beef burger, turkey burger, bison burger, portobello burger, or veggie burger. In Australia and New Zealand, a piece of chicken breast on a bun is known as a chicken burger, which would generally not be considered to be a burger in the United States; Americans would generally call it a chicken sandwich, but in Australian English and New Zealand English a sandwich requires sliced bread (not a bun), so it would not be considered a sandwich.

Hamburgers are typically sold at fast-food restaurants, diners, and other restaurants. There are many international and regional variations of hamburger.

Etymology and terminology
The term hamburger originally derives from Hamburg, the second-largest city in Germany; however, there is no certain connection between the food and the city  (see History below).

By back-formation, the term "burger" eventually became a self-standing word that is associated with many different types of sandwiches, similar to a (ground meat) hamburger, but made of different meats such as buffalo in the buffalo burger, venison, kangaroo, chicken, turkey, elk, lamb or fish such as salmon in the salmon burger, but even with meatless sandwiches as is the case of the veggie burger.

History

As versions of the meal have been served for over a century, its origin remains obscure. The 1758 edition of the book The Art of Cookery Made Plain and Easy by Hannah Glasse included a recipe in 1758 as "Hamburgh sausage," which suggested to serve it "roasted with toasted bread under it." A similar snack was also popular in Hamburg by the name "Rundstück warm" ("bread roll warm") in 1869 or earlier, and supposedly eaten by many emigrants on their way to America, but may have contained roasted beefsteak rather than Frikadeller. It has been suggested that Hamburg steak served between two pieces of bread and frequently eaten by Jewish passengers travelling from Hamburg to New York on Hamburg America Line vessels (which began operations in 1847) became so well known that the shipping company gave its name to the dish. Each of these may mark the invention of the hamburger and explain the name.

There is a reference to a "Hamburg steak" as early as 1884 in the Boston Journal.[OED, under "steak"] On July 5, 1896, the Chicago Daily Tribune made a highly specific claim regarding a "hamburger sandwich" in an article about a "Sandwich Car": "A distinguished favorite, only five cents, is Hamburger steak sandwich, the meat for which is kept ready in small patties and 'cooked while you wait' on the gasoline range."

Claims of invention 
The origin of the hamburger is unclear, though "hamburger steak sandwiches" have been advertised in U.S. newspapers from New York to Hawaii since at least the 1890s. The invention of hamburgers is commonly attributed to various people, including Charlie Nagreen, Frank and Charles Menches, Oscar Weber Bilby, Fletcher Davis, or Louis Lassen. White Castle traces the origin of the hamburger to Hamburg, Germany, with its invention by Otto Kuase. Some have pointed to a recipe for "Hamburgh sausages" on toasted bread, published in The Art of Cookery Made Plain and Easy by Hannah Glasse in 1747. Hamburgers gained national recognition in the U.S. at the 1904 St. Louis World's Fair when the New York Tribune referred to the hamburger as "the innovation of a food vendor on the pike." No conclusive argument has ended the dispute over invention. An article from ABC News sums up: "One problem is that there is little written history. Another issue is that the spread of the burger happened largely at the World's Fair, from tiny vendors that came and went in an instant. And it is entirely possible that more than one person came up with the idea at the same time in different parts of the country."

Louis Lassen
Although debunked by The Washington Post, a popular myth recorded by Connecticut Congresswoman Rosa DeLauro stated the first hamburger served in America was by Louis Lassen, a Danish immigrant, after he opened Louis' Lunch in New Haven in 1895. Louis' Lunch, a small lunch wagon in New Haven, Connecticut, is said to have sold the first hamburger and steak sandwich in the U.S. in 1900. New York Magazine states that "The dish actually had no name until some rowdy sailors from Hamburg named the meat on a bun after themselves years later," also noting that this claim is subject to dispute. A customer ordered a quick hot meal and Louis was out of steaks. Taking ground beef trimmings, Louis made a patty and grilled it, putting it between two slices of toast. Some critics such as Josh Ozersky, a food editor for New York Magazine, claim that this sandwich was not a hamburger because the bread was toasted.

Charlie Nagreen
One of the earliest claims comes from Charlie Nagreen, who in 1885 sold a meatball between two slices of bread at the Seymour Fair now sometimes called the Outagamie County Fair. The Seymour Community Historical Society of Seymour, Wisconsin, credits Nagreen, now known as "Hamburger Charlie," with the invention. Nagreen was 15 when he reportedly sold pork sandwiches at the 1885 Seymour Fair, made so customers could eat while walking. The Historical Society explains that Nagreen named the hamburger after the Hamburg steak with which local German immigrants were familiar.

Otto Kuase
According to White Castle, Otto Kuase was the inventor of the hamburger. In 1891, he created a beef patty cooked in butter and topped with a fried egg. German sailors later omitted the fried egg.

Oscar Weber Bilby
The family of Oscar Weber Bilby claims the first-known hamburger on a bun was served on July 4, 1891, on Grandpa Oscar's farm. The bun was a yeast bun. In 1995, Governor Frank Keating proclaimed that the first true hamburger on a bun was created and consumed in Tulsa, Oklahoma in 1891, calling Tulsa, "The Real Birthplace of the Hamburger."

Frank and Charles Menches

Frank and Charles Menches claim to have sold a ground beef sandwich at the Erie County Fair in 1885 in Hamburg, New York. During the fair, they ran out of pork sausage for their sandwiches and substituted beef. The brothers exhausted their supply of sausage, so they purchased chopped-up beef from a butcher, Andrew Klein. Historian Joseph Streamer wrote that the meat was from Stein's market, not Klein's, despite Stein's having sold the market in 1874. The story notes that the name of the hamburger comes from Hamburg, New York, not Hamburg, Germany. Frank Menches's obituary in The New York Times states that these events took place at the 1892 Summit County Fair in Akron, Ohio.

Fletcher Davis
Fletcher Davis of Athens, Texas claimed to have invented the hamburger. According to oral histories, in the 1880s, he opened a lunch counter in Athens and served a 'burger' of fried ground beef patties with mustard and Bermuda onion between two slices of bread, with a pickle on the side. The story is that in 1904, Davis and his wife Ciddy ran a sandwich stand at the St. Louis World's Fair. Historian Frank X. Tolbert noted that Athens resident Clint Murchison said his grandfather dated the hamburger to the 1880s with Fletcher "Old Dave" Davis. A photo of "Old Dave's Hamburger Stand" from 1904 was sent to Tolbert as evidence of the claim.

Other hamburger-steak claims
Various non-specific claims of the invention relate to the term "hamburger steak" without mention of its being a sandwich. The first printed American menu which listed hamburger is said to be an 1834 menu from Delmonico's in New York. However, the printer of the original menu was not in business in 1834. In 1889, a menu from Walla Walla Union in Washington offered hamburger steak as a menu item.

Between 1871 and 1884, "Hamburg Beefsteak" was on the "Breakfast and Supper Menu" of the Clipper Restaurant at 311/313 Pacific Street in San Fernando, California. It cost 10 cents—the same price as mutton chops, pig's feet in batter, and stewed veal. It was not, however, on the dinner menu. Only "Pig's Head," "Calf Tongue," and "Stewed Kidneys" were listed. Another claim ties the hamburger to Summit County, New York, or Ohio. Summit County, Ohio, exists, but Summit County, New York, does not.

Early major vendors

 1921: White Castle, Wichita, Kansas. Due to widely anti-German sentiment in the U.S. during World War I, an alternative name for hamburgers was Salisbury steak. Following the war, hamburgers became unpopular until the White Castle restaurant chain marketed and sold large numbers of small  square hamburgers, known as sliders. They created five holes in each patty, which helped them cook evenly and eliminated the need to flip the burger. In 1995, White Castle began selling frozen hamburgers in convenience stores and vending machines.
 1923: Kewpee Hamburgers, or Kewpee Hotels, Flint, Michigan. Kewpee was the second hamburger chain and peaked at 400 locations before World War II. Many of these were licensed but not strictly franchised. Many closed during WWII. Between 1955 and 1967, another wave closed or caused changes in name. In 1967 the Kewpee licensor moved the company to a franchise system. Currently, only five locations exist.
 1926: White Tower Hamburgers
 1927: Little Tavern
 1930s: White Castle (II; run by Henry Cassada)
 1931: Krystal
 1936: Big Boy. In 1937, Bob Wian created the double-deck hamburger at his stand in Glendale, California. Big Boy would become the name of the hamburger, the mascot, and the restaurants. Big Boy expanded nationally through regional franchising and subfranchising. Primarily operating as drive-in restaurants in the 1950s, interior dining gradually replaced curb service by the early 1970s. Many franchises have closed or operate independently, but at the remaining American restaurants, the Big Boy double-deck hamburger remains the signature item.
 1940: McDonald's restaurant, San Bernardino, California, was opened by Richard and Maurice McDonald. Their introduction of the "Speedee Service System" in 1948 established the principles of the modern fast-food restaurant. The McDonald brothers began franchising in 1953. In 1961, Ray Kroc (the supplier of their multi-mixer milkshake machines) purchased the company from the brothers for $2.7 million and a 1.9% royalty.

Today

Hamburgers are usually a feature of fast food restaurants. The hamburgers served in major fast food establishments are usually mass-produced in factories and frozen for delivery to the site. These hamburgers are thin and of uniform thickness, differing from the traditional American hamburger prepared in homes and conventional restaurants, which is thicker and prepared by hand from ground beef. Most American hamburgers are round, but some fast-food chains, such as Wendy's, sell square-cut hamburgers. Hamburgers in fast food restaurants are usually grilled on a flat top, but some firms, such as Burger King, use a gas flame grilling process. At conventional American restaurants, hamburgers may be ordered "rare" but normally are served medium-well or well-done for food safety reasons. Fast food restaurants do not usually offer this option.

The McDonald's fast-food chain sells the Big Mac, one of the world's top-selling hamburgers, with an estimated 550 million sold annually in the United States. Other major fast-food chains, including Burger King (also known as Hungry Jack's in Australia), A&W, Culver's, Whataburger, Carl's Jr./Hardee's chain, Wendy's (known for their square patties), Jack in the Box, Cook Out, Harvey's, Shake Shack, In-N-Out Burger, Five Guys, Fatburger, Vera's, Burgerville, Back Yard Burgers, Lick's Homeburger, Roy Rogers, Smashburger, and Sonic also rely heavily on hamburger sales. Fuddruckers and Red Robin are hamburger chains that specialize in the mid-tier "restaurant-style" variety of hamburgers.

Some restaurants offer elaborate hamburgers using expensive cuts of meat and various cheeses, toppings, and sauces. One example is the Bobby's Burger Palace chain founded by well-known chef and Food Network star Bobby Flay.

Hamburgers are often served as a fast dinner, picnic, or party food and are often cooked outdoors on barbecue grills.

A high-quality hamburger patty is made entirely of ground (minced) beef and seasonings; these may be described as "all-beef hamburger" or "all-beef patties" to distinguish them from inexpensive hamburgers made with cost-savers like added flour, textured vegetable protein, ammonia treated defatted beef trimmings (which the company Beef Products Inc, calls "lean finely textured beef"), advanced meat recovery, or other fillers. In the 1930s, ground liver was sometimes added. Some cooks prepare their patties with binders like eggs or breadcrumbs. Seasonings may include salt and pepper and others like parsley, onions, soy sauce, Thousand Island dressing, onion soup mix, or Worcestershire sauce. Many name-brand seasoned salt products are also used.

Safety
Raw hamburger may contain harmful bacteria that can produce food-borne illnesses such as Escherichia coli O157:H7, due to the occasional initial improper preparation of the meat, so caution is needed during handling and cooking. If cooked to this temperature, they are considered well-done.

Variations

Other meats
Burgers can also be made with patties made from ingredients other than beef. For example, a turkey burger uses ground turkey meat, a chicken burger uses ground chicken meat. A buffalo burger uses ground meat from a bison, and an ostrich burger is made from ground seasoned ostrich meat. A deer burger uses ground venison from deer.

Veggie burgers

Vegetarian and vegan burgers can be formed from a meat analogue, a meat substitute such as tofu, TVP, seitan (wheat gluten), quorn, beans, grains or an assortment of vegetables, ground up and mashed into patties.

Vegetable patties have existed in various Eurasian cuisines for millennia and are a commonplace item in Indian cuisine.

Steak burgers 

A steak burger is a marketing term for a hamburger claimed to be of superior quality, except in Australia, where it is a sandwich containing a steak.

Use of the term "steakburger" dates to the 1920s in the United States. In the U.S. in 1934, A.H. "Gus" Belt, the founder of Steak 'n Shake, devised a higher-quality hamburger and offered it as a "steakburger" to customers at the company's first location in Normal, Illinois. This burger used a combination of ground meat from the strip portion of T-bone steak and sirloin steak in its preparation. Steakburgers are a primary menu item at Steak 'n Shake restaurants, and the company's registered trademarks included "original steakburger" and "famous for steakburgers." Steak 'n Shake's "Prime Steakburgers" are now made of choice grade brisket and chuck.

Beef is typical, although other meats such as lamb and pork may also be used. The meat is ground or chopped.

In Australia, a steak burger is a steak sandwich that contains a whole steak, not ground meat.

Steak burgers may be cooked to various degrees of doneness.

Steakburgers may be served with standard hamburger toppings such as lettuce, onion, and tomato. Some may have various additional toppings such as cheese, bacon, fried egg, mushrooms, additional meats, and others.

Various fast food outlets and restaurants  such as Burger King, Carl's Jr., Hardee's, IHOP, Steak 'n Shake, Mr. Steak, and Freddy's  market steak burgers. Some restaurants offer high-end burgers prepared from aged beef. Additionally, many restaurants have used the term "steakburger" at various times.

Some baseball parks concessions in the United States call their hamburgers steak burgers, such as Johnny Rosenblatt Stadium in Omaha, Nebraska.

Burger King introduced the Sirloin Steak sandwich in 1979 as part of a menu expansion that, in turn, was part of a corporate restructuring effort for the company. It was a single oblong patty made of chopped steak served on a sub-style sesame seed roll. Additional steak burgers that Burger King has offered are the Angus Bacon Cheddar Ranch Steak Burger, the Angus Bacon & Cheese Steak Burger, and a limited edition Stuffed Steakhouse Burger.

In 2004, Steak 'n Shake sued Burger King over the latter's use of the term Steak Burger in conjunction with one of its menu items, claiming that such use infringed on trademark rights.
(According to the St. Louis Post-Dispatch, Burger King's attorneys "grilled" Steak 'n Shake's CEO in court about the precise content of Steak 'n Shake's steakburger offering.) The case was settled out of court.

United States and Canada

The hamburger is considered a national dish of the United States. In the United States and Canada, burgers may be classified as two main types: fast food hamburgers and individually prepared burgers made in homes and restaurants. The latter are often prepared with a variety of toppings, including lettuce, tomato, onion, and often sliced pickles (or pickle relish). French fries (or commonly Poutine in Canada) often accompany the burger. Cheese (usually processed cheese slices but often Cheddar, Swiss, pepper jack, or blue), either melted directly on the meat patty or crumbled on top, is generally an option.

Condiments might be added to a hamburger or may be offered separately on the side, including ketchup, mustard, mayonnaise, relish, salad dressings and barbecue sauce.

Other toppings can include bacon, avocado or guacamole, sliced sautéed mushrooms, cheese sauce, chili (usually without beans), fried egg, scrambled egg, feta cheese, blue cheese, salsa, pineapple, jalapeños and other kinds of chili peppers, anchovies, slices of ham or bologna, pastrami or teriyaki-seasoned beef, tartar sauce, french fries, onion rings or potato chips.

Standard toppings on hamburgers may depend upon location, particularly at restaurants that are not national or regional franchises.
Restaurants may offer hamburgers with multiple meat patties. The most common variants are double and triple hamburgers, but California-based burger chain In-N-Out once sold a sandwich with one hundred patties, called a "100x100."
Pastrami burgers may be served in Salt Lake City, Utah.
 A patty melt consists of a patty, sautéed onions and cheese between two slices of rye bread. The sandwich is then buttered and fried.
 A slider is a very small square hamburger patty served on an equally small bun and usually sprinkled with diced onions. According to the earliest citations, the name originated aboard U.S. Navy ships due to how greasy burgers slid across the galley grill as the ship pitched and rolled. Other versions claim the term "slider" originated from the hamburgers served by flight line galleys at military airfields, which were so greasy they slid right through one, or because their small size allows them to "slide" right down the throat in one or two bites.
 In Alberta, Canada, a "kubie burger" is a hamburger made with a pressed Ukrainian sausage (kubasa).
 A butter burger, found commonly throughout Wisconsin and the upper midwest, is a normal burger with a pad of butter as a topping or a heavily buttered bun. It is the signature menu item of the restaurant chain Culver's.
 The Fat Boy is an iconic hamburger with chili meat sauce originating in the Greek burger restaurants of Winnipeg, Manitoba
 In Minnesota, a "Juicy Lucy" (also spelled "Jucy Lucy"), is a hamburger having cheese inside the meat patty rather than on top. A piece of cheese is surrounded by raw meat and cooked until it melts, resulting in a molten core of cheese within the patty. This scalding hot cheese tends to gush out at the first bite, so servers frequently instruct customers to let the sandwich cool for a few minutes before consumption.
 A low carb burger is a hamburger served without a bun and replaced with large slices of lettuce, with mayonnaise or mustard being the sauces primarily used.
 A ramen burger, invented by Keizo Shimamoto, is a hamburger patty sandwiched between two discs of compressed ramen noodles in lieu of a traditional bun.
 Luther Burger is a bacon cheeseburger with two glazed doughnuts instead of buns.
 Steamed cheeseburger is a cheeseburger where the burger is steamed instead of grilled. It was invented in Connecticut.

France 
In 2012, according to a study by the NDP cabinet, the French consume 14 hamburgers in restaurants per year per person, placing them fourth in the world and second in Europe, just behind the British.

According to a study by Gira Conseil on the consumption of hamburgers in France in 2013, 75% of traditional French restaurants offer at least one hamburger on their menu, and for a third of these restaurants, it has become the leader in the range of dishes, ahead of rib steaks, grills or fish.

Mexico
In Mexico, burgers (called hamburguesas) are served with ham and slices of American cheese fried on top of the meat patty. The toppings include avocado, jalapeño slices, shredded lettuce, onion, and tomato. The bun has mayonnaise, ketchup, and mustard. Bacon may also be added, which can be fried or grilled along with the meat patty. A slice of pineapple may be added to a hamburger for a "Hawaiian hamburger."

Some restaurants' burgers also have barbecue sauce, and others replace the ground patty with sirloin, Al pastor meat, barbacoa, or fried chicken breast. Many burger chains from the United States can be found all over Mexico, including Carl's Jr., Sonic, McDonald's, and Burger King.

United Kingdom and Ireland
Hamburgers in the UK and Ireland are very similar to those in the US, and the same big two chains dominate the High Street as in the U.S. — McDonald's and Burger King. The menus offered to both countries are virtually identical, although portion sizes tend to be smaller in the UK. In Ireland, the food outlet Supermacs is widespread throughout the country, serving burgers as part of its menu. In Ireland, Abrakebabra (started out selling kebabs) and Eddie Rocket's are also major chains.

An original and indigenous rival to the big two U.S. giants was the quintessentially British fast-food chain Wimpy, originally known as Wimpy Bar (opened 1954 at the Lyon's Corner House in Coventry Street London), which served its hamburgers on a plate with British-style chips, accompanied by cutlery and delivered to the customer's table. In the late 1970s, to compete with McDonald's, Wimpy began to open American-style counter-service restaurants, and the brand disappeared from many UK high streets when those restaurants were re-branded as Burger Kings between 1989 and 1990 by the then-owner of both brands, Grand Metropolitan. A management buyout in 1990 split the brands again, and now Wimpy table-service restaurants can still be found in many town centres, whilst new counter-service Wimpys are now often found at motorway service stations.

Hamburgers are also available from mobile kiosks, commonly known as “burger vans,", particularly at outdoor events such as football matches. Burgers from this type of outlet are usually served without any form of salad — only fried onions and a choice of tomato ketchup, mustard, or brown sauce.

Chip shops, particularly in the West Midlands and North-East of England, Scotland, and Ireland, serve battered hamburgers called batter burgers. This is where the burger patty is deep-fat-fried in batter and is usually served with chips.

Hamburgers and veggie burgers served with chips, and salad is standard pub grub menu items. Many pubs specialize in "gourmet" burgers. These are usually high-quality minced steak patties topped with things such as blue cheese, brie, avocado, anchovy mayonnaise, et cetera. Some British pubs serve burger patties made from more exotic meats, including venison burgers (sometimes nicknamed Bambi Burgers), bison burgers, ostrich burgers, and in some Australian-themed pubs even kangaroo burgers can be purchased. These burgers are served similarly to the traditional hamburger but are sometimes served with a different sauce, including redcurrant sauce, mint sauce, and plum sauce.

In the early 21st century, "premium" hamburger chains and independent restaurants have arisen, selling burgers produced from meat stated to be of high quality and often organic, usually served to eat on the premises rather than to take away. Chains include Gourmet Burger Kitchen, Ultimate Burger, Hamburger Union and Byron Hamburgers in London. Independent restaurants such as Meatmarket and Dirty Burger developed a style of rich, juicy burger in 2012 which is known as a dirty burger or third-wave burger.

In recent years Rustlers has sold pre-cooked hamburgers reheatable in a microwave oven in the United Kingdom.

In the UK, as in North America and Japan, the term "burger" can refer simply to the patty, be it beef, some other kind of meat, or vegetarian.

Australia and New Zealand

Fast food franchises sell American-style fast-food hamburgers in Australia and New Zealand. The traditional Australasian hamburgers are usually bought from fish and chip shops or milk bars rather than from chain restaurants. These traditional hamburgers are becoming less common as older-style fast food outlets decrease in number. The hamburger meat is almost always ground beef, or "mince," as it is more commonly referred to in Australia and New Zealand. They commonly include tomato, lettuce, grilled onion, and meat as minimum—in this form, known in Australia as a "plain hamburger," which often also includes a slice of beetroot—and, optionally, can include cheese, beetroot, pineapple, a fried egg, and bacon. If all these optional ingredients are included, it is known in Australia as a "burger with the lot."

In Australia and New Zealand, as in the United Kingdom, the word sandwich is generally reserved for two slices of bread (from a loaf) with fillings in between them – unlike in American English where a sandwich is fillings between two pieces of any kind of bread, not only slices of bread – as such burgers are not generally considered to be sandwiches. The term burger is applied to any cut bun with a hot filling, even when the filling does not contain beef, such as a chicken burger (generally with chicken breast rather than chicken mince), salmon burger, pulled pork burger, veggie burger, etc.

The only variance between the two countries' hamburgers is that New Zealand's equivalent to "The Lot" often contains a steak (beef). The condiments regularly used are barbecue sauce and tomato sauce. The traditional Australasian hamburger never includes mayonnaise. The McDonald's "McOz" Burger is partway between American and Australian style burgers, having beetroot and tomato in an otherwise typical American burger; however, it is no longer a part of the menu. Likewise, McDonald's in New Zealand created a Kiwiburger, similar to a Quarter Pounder, but features salad, beetroot, and a fried egg. The Hungry Jack's (Burger King) "Aussie Burger" has tomato, lettuce, onion, cheese, bacon, beetroot, egg, ketchup, and a meat patty, while adding pineapple is an upcharge. It is essentially a "Burger with the lot" but uses the standard HJ circular breakfast Egg rather than the fully fried egg used by local fish shops.

China

In China, due to the branding of their sandwiches by McDonald's and KFC restaurants in China, the word "burger" refers to all sandwiches that consist of two pieces of bun and a meat patty in between. This has led to confusion when Chinese nationals try to order sandwiches with meat fillings other than beef in fast-food restaurants in North America.

Since the sandwich dates back to the Qin dynasty (221–206 BC) and fits the aforementioned Chinese word for burger, Chinese media have claimed that the hamburger was invented in China.

Japan

Hamburg steaks (served without buns) are similar to what are known as Salisbury steaks in the US. They are made from minced beef, pork, or a blend of the two mixed with minced onions, eggs, breadcrumbs, and spices. They are served with brown sauce (or demi-glace in restaurants) with vegetable or salad sides, or occasionally in Japanese curries. Hamburgers may be served in casual, western-style suburban restaurant chains known in Japan as "family restaurants."

On the other hand, Hamburgers in buns are predominantly the domain of fast food chains. Japan has homegrown hamburger chain restaurants such as MOS Burger, First Kitchen, and Freshness Burger. Local varieties of burgers served in Japan include teriyaki burgers,  burgers (containing ) and burgers containing shrimp . Some of the more unusual examples include the rice burger, where the bun is made of rice, and the luxury 1,000-yen (US$10) "Takumi Burger" (meaning "artisan taste"), featuring avocados, freshly grated wasabi, and other rare seasonal ingredients. In terms of the actual patty, there are burgers made with Kobe beef, butchered from cows that are fed with beer and massaged daily. McDonald's Japan also recently launched a McPork burger made with US pork. McDonald's has been gradually losing market share in Japan to these local hamburger chains due partly to the preference of Japanese diners for fresh ingredients and more refined, "upscale" hamburger offerings. Burger King once retreated from Japan, but re-entered the market in summer 2007 in cooperation with the Korean-owned Japanese fast-food chain Lotteria.

Denmark 

In Denmark, the hamburger was introduced in 1949, though it was called the bøfsandwich. There are many variations. While the original bøfsandwich was simply a generic meat patty containing a mix of beef and horse meat, with slightly different garnish (mustard, ketchup, and soft onions), it has continued to evolve. Today, a bøfsandwich usually contains a beef patty, pickled cucumber, raw, pickled, fried, and/or soft onions, pickled red beets, mustard, ketchup, remoulade, and perhaps most strikingly, is often overflowing with brown gravy, which is sometimes even poured on top of the assembled bøfsandwich. The original bøfsandwich is still on the menu at the same restaurant from which it originated in 1949, now run by the original owner's grandson.

Following the popularity of the bøfsandwich, many variations sprung up, using different types of meat instead of the beef patty. One variation, the flæskestegssandwich, grew especially popular. This variation replaces the minced beef patty with slices of pork loin or belly and typically uses sweet-and-sour pickled red cabbage, mayonnaise, mustard, and pork rinds as garnish.

Today, the bøfsandwich, flæskestegssandwich, and their many variations co-exist with the more typical hamburger, with the opening of the first Burger King restaurant in 1977 popularizing the original dish in Denmark. Many local, high-end burger restaurants dot the major cities, including Popl, an offshoot of Noma.

East Asia

Rice burgers mentioned above are also available in several East Asian countries such as Taiwan and South Korea. Lotteria is a big hamburger franchise in Japan owned by the South Korean Lotte group, with outlets also in China, South Korea, Vietnam, and Taiwan. In addition to selling beef hamburgers, they have hamburgers made from squid, pork, tofu, and shrimp. Variations available in South Korea include Bulgogi burgers and Kimchi burgers.

In the Philippines, a wide range of major U.S. fast-food franchises are well represented, together with local imitators, often amended to the local palate. The chain McDonald's (locally nicknamed "McDo") has a range of burger and chicken dishes often accompanied by plain steamed rice or French fries. The Philippines boasts its own burger chain called Jollibee, which offers burger meals and chicken, including a signature burger called "Champ." Jollibee now has several outlets in the United States, the Middle East, and East Asia.

India

In India, burgers are usually made from chicken or vegetable patties due to cultural beliefs against eating beef (which stem from Hindu religious practice) and pork (which stems from Islamic religious practice). Because of this, most fast food chains and restaurants in India do not serve beef. McDonald's in India, for instance, does not serve beef, offering the "Maharaja Mac" instead of the Big Mac, substituting the beef patties with chicken. Another version of the Indian vegetarian burger is the wada pav, consisting of a deep-fried potato patty dipped in gram flour batter. It is usually served with mint chutney and fried green chili. Another alternative is the "Buff Burger," made with buffalo meat.

Pakistan

In Pakistan, apart from American fast food chains, burgers can be found in stalls near shopping areas, the best known being the "shami burger." This is made from "shami kebab," made by mixing lentils and minced lamb. Onions, scrambled eggs, and ketchup are the most popular toppings.

Malaysia

In Malaysia, there are 300 McDonald's restaurants. The menu in Malaysia also includes eggs and fried chicken on top of regular burgers. Burgers are also easily found at nearby mobile kiosks, especially Ramly Burger.

Mongolia

In Mongolia, a recent fast food craze due to the sudden influx of foreign influence has led to the prominence of the hamburger. Specialized fast food restaurants serving to Mongolian tastes have sprung up and seen great success.

Turkey

In Turkey, in addition to the internationally familiar offerings, numerous localized variants of the hamburger may be found, such as the Islak Burger (lit. "Wet-Burger"), which is a beef slider doused in seasoned tomato sauce and steamed inside a special glass chamber, and has its origins in the Turkish fast food retailer Kizilkayalar. Other variations include lamb burgers and offal-burgers, which are offered by local fast food businesses and global chains alike, such as McDonald's and Burger King. Most burger shops have also adopted a pizzeria-like approach to home delivery, and almost all major fast food chains deliver.

Yugoslavia and Serbia

In the former Yugoslavia, and originally in Serbia, there is a local version of the hamburger known as the pljeskavica. It is often served as a patty but may also have a bun.

Belgium and Netherlands

Throughout Belgium and in some eateries in the Netherlands, a Bicky Burger is sold that combines pork, chicken, and horse meat. The hamburger, usually fried, is served between a bun, sprinkled with sesame seeds. It often comes with a specific Bickysaus (Bicky dressing) made with mayonnaise, mustard, cabbage, and onion.

Unusual hamburgers
 In May 2012, Serendipity 3 was recognized as the Guinness World Record holder for serving the world's most expensive hamburger, the $295 Le Burger Extravagant.
 At $499, the world's largest hamburger commercially available weighs  and is sold at Mallie's Sports Grill & Bar in Southgate, Michigan. Called the "Absolutely Ridiculous Burger," it takes about 12 hours to prepare. It was cooked and adjudicated on May 30, 2009.
 A $777 Kobe beef and Maine lobster burger, topped with caramelized onion, Brie cheese, and prosciutto, was reported available at Le Burger Brasserie, inside the Paris Las Vegas casino.
 On August 5, 2013, the first hamburger from a meat lab grown from cow stem cells was served. The hamburger was the result of research in the Netherlands led by Mark Post at Maastricht University and sponsored by Google's co-founder Sergey Brin.

Slang
 "$100 hamburger" ("hundred-dollar hamburger") is aviation slang for a general aviation pilot needing an excuse to fly. A $100 hamburger trip typically involves flying a short distance (less than two hours), eating at an airport restaurant, and flying home.

See also

 Cheeseburger
 Chicken sandwich
 Chicken nugget
 French fries
 Frikadeller
 Frikandel
 Kofta
 Hamburg steak
 Hot dog
 List of hamburgers
 List of hamburger restaurants
 List of sandwiches
 Meat grinder
 Pljeskavica a traditional Balkan meal
 Salisbury steak
 
 Steak sandwich

References

Further reading
 Barber, Katherine, editor (2004). The Canadian Oxford Dictionary, second edition. Toronto, Oxford University Press. .
  History and Origins of the Hamburger

External links

 
 
 

American sandwiches
Culture in Hamburg
Fast food
German cuisine
German-American cuisine
 
National dishes
German sandwiches
Hot sandwiches
Articles containing video clips